Tlokh is a rural locality (a selo) in Botlikhsky District, Republic of Dagestan, Russia. The population was 770 as of 2010. There are 39 streets.

Geography 
Tlokh is located on the right bank of the Andiyskoye Koysu River, 24 km east of Botlikh (the district's administrative centre) by road. Kilyatl is the nearest rural locality.

References 

Rural localities in Botlikhsky District